Russell Center is an unincorporated community in Geauga County, in the U.S. state of Ohio. Russell Center is a synonym for Russell Township. Russell Center is not a Census designated place, nor does it have its own postal code. The postal codes for Russell Township include 44072 and 44022.

History
A variant name was Russell. A post office called Russell was established in 1828, and remained in operation until 1881. Ebenezer Russell served as first postmaster.

References

Unincorporated communities in Geauga County, Ohio
Unincorporated communities in Ohio